Mahendra Yadav (Nepali: महेन्द्र यादव) is a Nepali politician of Nepali Congress and former Minister of Water Supply and Sanitation in Deuba cabinet. He is also Deputy general secretary of Nepali Congress.

Political life 
The 3rd general convention of Tarul Dal which was held in Chitawan, July 17–20, 2007 had elected Mahendra Yadav as the new president of Nepal Tarun Dal. He is close to former DPM Bimalendra Nidhi and PM Sher Bahadur Deuba from the same time he supported Nepali Congress (Democratic) whose president was Deuba and general secretary was Nidhi. He also served as member of the 1st Constituent Assembly and 2nd Constituent Assembly from Nepali Congress party. He joined Deuba cabinet on 26 July 2017 as Minister of Water Supply and Sanitation.

Electoral history 
He filled candidacy from Dhanusha-4 but lost by small margin due to caste factor, intra-party misunderstanding and two Yadav candidates in field. Previously, he represented in both constituent assemblies from proportional list of Nepali Congress.

2017 legislative elections

See also 
 Bimalendra Nidhi
 2022 Janakpur municipal election
 Ram Krishna Yadav
 Ananda Prasad Dhungana

References 

Nepali Congress politicians from Madhesh Province
Nepali Congress (Democratic) politicians
Nepal MPs 2017–2022
Government ministers of Nepal
Living people
Year of birth missing (living people)
Date of birth missing (living people)
People from Dhanusha District
Madhesi people
Nepalese Hindus
Tribhuvan University alumni
Members of the 1st Nepalese Constituent Assembly
Members of the 2nd Nepalese Constituent Assembly